Charles Henry Pitman Sr. (20 October 1935 – 13 February 2020) was a lieutenant general in the United States Marine Corps who served as Deputy Chief of Staff for Aviation. He was also involved in the 1980 Operation Eagle Claw. Pitman retired in 1990 and died of cancer in 2020.

1973 shooting
On January 7, 1973, Mark Essex went on a racially motivated killing spree targeting White people in New Orleans, eventually culminating in a standoff in which he retreated to and barricaded himself in a concrete stairwell enclosure on the roof of a high-rise hotel. Lt. Colonel Pitman commandeered a CH-46 military helicopter to assist police, conducting landings near the hotel to transport armed officers, and conducting numerous strafing runs over the roof of the hotel, in which the officers inside the helicopter and Essex exchanged many rounds over many hours. Shortly before 9 p.m., after all negotiation and communication tactics had failed, and after spending almost seven hours crouched in the cubicle, Essex suddenly charged into the open with his rifle at waist height and his right fist aloft, shouting "Come and get me!" before being almost immediately shot by police sharpshooters positioned on the roofs of adjacent buildings. Pitman's helicopter, which had just approached to begin another strafing operation, also fired scores of rounds into Essex's body. The momentum of the bullets propelled his vertical body several feet before Essex fell on his back approximately twenty feet from the cubicle, having failed to kill or wound any further officers in this final act. The barrage of gunfire would continue for almost four minutes. An autopsy later revealed Essex had received more than 200 gunshot wounds.

Shooting aftermath
The United States Marine Corps considered a court-martial for Charles Pitman for taking the helicopter without prior approval. However, New Orleans-based Representative Edward Herbert, then chairman of the House Armed Services Committee, recommended the issue be dropped.

Moon Landrieu, then mayor of New Orleans, has stated recently, "Without that helicopter and without his piloting, it would've been a lot worse." "The city owes him a debt of gratitude."

Antoine Saacks, a former police officer who boarded Pitman's helicopter that day, said, "I always say the true heroes were Chuck and his crew, undoubtedly. I have a tremendous amount of respect for the man that's unwavering."

See also
 Mark Essex

References

External links
 40 years after sniper Mark Essex, Marine pilot is proud he helped stop the carnage

1935 births
2020 deaths
United States Marine Corps personnel of the Vietnam War
American Vietnam War pilots
Military personnel from Chicago
Recipients of the Defense Superior Service Medal
Recipients of the Distinguished Flying Cross (United States)
Recipients of the Legion of Merit
Recipients of the Navy Distinguished Service Medal
Recipients of the Silver Star
United States Marine Corps generals
United States Naval Aviators